The 2018 FIFA U-17 Women's World Cup was the 6th edition of the FIFA U-17 Women's World Cup, the biennial international women's youth football championship contested by the under-17 national teams of the member associations of FIFA, since its inception in 2008.

The tournament was held in Uruguay from 13 November to 1 December 2018. North Korea were the defending champions but were eliminated by Spain in the quarter-finals.

The final took place at the Estadio Charrúa, Montevideo between Spain and Mexico a rematch from the group stage in 2016. Spain won their first title, beating Mexico 2–1 in the Final.

Host selection
On 6 March 2014, FIFA announced that bidding had begun for the 2018 FIFA U-17 Women's World Cup. Member associations interested in hosting must submit a declaration of interest by 15 April 2014, and provide the complete set of bidding documents by 31 October 2014.

The following countries made official bids for hosting the tournament:

The decision on the hosts was originally to be made at the FIFA Executive Committee meeting on 19–20 March 2015, but no announcement was made after the meeting.

During FIFA President Gianni Infantino's visit to Uruguay in March 2016, Uruguay showed interest in organizing the event. The FIFA Council appointed Uruguay as host on 10 May 2016.

Qualified teams
A total of 16 teams qualify for the final tournament. In addition to Uruguay who qualified automatically as hosts, the other 15 teams qualify from six separate continental competitions. The slot allocation was approved by the FIFA Council on 13–14 October 2016.

Venues

Branding
The emblem was launched on 16 November 2017 at the Palacio Legislativo in Montevideo. The emblem is inspired by the famous beach coastline and its shape of the tournament's trophy. It features the Uruguayan flower ceibo, the Candombe drummer and the sun from the national flag.

Mascot
The mascot named Capi was unveiled on 7 June 2018, she is inspired by a Uruguayan capybara.

Slogan
The slogan "Same Game, Same Emotion" was unveiled on 29 September 2018.

Draw
The official draw was held on 30 May 2018, 15:00 CEST (UTC+2), at the FIFA Headquarters in Zürich. The teams were seeded based on their performances in previous U-17 Women's World Cups and confederation tournaments, with the hosts Uruguay automatically seeded and assigned to position A1. Teams of the same confederation could not meet in the group stage.

The identity of the three teams from CONCACAF were not known at the time of the draw, and were seeded based on the rankings of the three best-performing teams from the region in previous editions. They were assigned to the three places reserved for CONCACAF after the qualifying tournament was completed based on their rankings in the seeding formula (instead of their rankings in the qualifying tournament).

Match officials
A total of 15 referees and 28 assistant referees were appointed by FIFA for the tournament.

Squads

Players born between 1 January 2001 and 31 December 2003 are eligible to compete in the tournament. Each team has to name a preliminary squad of 35 players. From the preliminary squad, the team has to name a final squad of 21 players (three of whom must be goalkeepers) by the FIFA deadline. Players in the final squad can be replaced due to serious injury up to 24 hours prior to kickoff of the team's first match.

Group stage

The official schedule was unveiled on 8 February 2018.

The top two teams of each group advance to the quarter-finals. The rankings of teams in each group are determined as follows (regulations Article 17.7):

If two or more teams are equal on the basis of the above three criteria, their rankings are determined as follows:

All times are local, UYT (UTC−3).

Group A

Group B

Group C

Group D

Knockout stage
In the knockout stages, if a match was level at the end of normal playing time, a penalty shoot-out was used to determine the winner (no extra time was played).

Bracket

Quarter-finals

Semi-finals

Third place match

Final

Winners

Goalscorers

Awards
The following awards were given for the tournament:

References

External links

FIFA U-17 Women's World Cup Uruguay 2018, FIFA.com
FIFA Technical Report

2018
2018 FIFA U-17 Women's World Cup
Youth sport in Uruguay
2018 in women's association football
2018 in youth association football
2018 in Uruguayan football
Foo
November 2018 sports events in South America
December 2018 sports events in South America